Pseudagrion coeruleipunctum is a species of damselfly in the family Coenagrionidae. It is found in Angola and Zambia. Its natural habitats are rivers and swamps.

References

Coenagrionidae
Insects described in 1964
Taxonomy articles created by Polbot